Mellano is an Italian surname. Notable people with the surname include:

 Mauro Mellano (1944–2007), Italian economist
 Olivier Mellano (born 1971), French composer

Italian-language surnames